Eduardo Campbell (2 July 1933 – 16 May 1993) was a Panamanian wrestler. He competed at the 1960 Summer Olympics and the 1964 Summer Olympics.

References

External links
 

1933 births
1993 deaths
Panamanian male sport wrestlers
Olympic wrestlers of Panama
Wrestlers at the 1960 Summer Olympics
Wrestlers at the 1964 Summer Olympics
Pan American Games medalists in wrestling
Pan American Games silver medalists for Panama
Wrestlers at the 1959 Pan American Games
Wrestlers at the 1963 Pan American Games